Salah Eldin Atef Salah Eldin commonly known as Rico (born February 6, 1991in Cairo) is an Egyptian football defensive midfielder plays for Ghazl El Mahalla of Egypt.

References

1991 births
Living people
Egyptian footballers
Ittihad El Shorta SC players
Zamalek SC players
Misr Lel Makkasa SC players
ENPPI SC players
Ghazl El Mahalla SC players
Egyptian Premier League players
Footballers from Cairo
Association football midfielders